Colten Sopp (born May 18, 1991), better known by the ring name Colten Gunn, is an American professional wrestler. He is currently signed to  All Elite Wrestling (AEW) where he teams with his brother, Austin, as the Gunns; they are the current AEW World Tag Team Champions in their first reign. He is the son of WWE Hall of Famer Billy Gunn.

Early life 
Sopp attended Florida State University, graduating in 2013. Prior to becoming a professional wrestler, he worked in the construction industry in Southern California.

Professional wrestling career

All Elite Wrestling (2020–present) 

Sopp was trained to wrestle by his father, Billy Gunn. On June 17, 2020, he appeared with the Jacksonville, Florida-based promotion All Elite Wrestling (AEW), accompanying his father to ringside for his match against Maxwell Jacob Friedman on AEW Dynamite and being confronted by Friedman's bodyguard Wardlow. Later that month, Sopp's father filed a trademark for "Colten Gunn". On episode #53 of the web television show AEW Dark, which aired on September 22, Sopp accompanied his father and his brother to ringside for a tag team match.

Sopp made his professional wrestling debut with AEW on November 11, 2020 as "Colten Gunn", teaming with his father and his brother Austin (as "Gunn Club") to defeat BSHP King, Joey O'Riley, and Sean Maluta in a six-man tag team match. The match was broadcast on episode #62 of AEW Dark on November 17, 2020. He returned in the following weeks, teaming with his father and brother in further six-man tag team matches and tag team matches. As part of Gunn Club, Gunn became a member of Cody Rhodes' Nightmare Family stable. On the March 3, 2021 episode of AEW Dynamite, Gunn Club were at ringside for a tag team match pitting Rhodes and Red Velvet against Shaquille O'Neal and Jade Cargill; during the match, Austin Gunn attacked O'Neal at ringside, prompting him to beat down Austin and Colten. Gunn wrestled his first match on pay-per-view at Revolution on March 7, 2021, competing alongside Austin in a "casino" tag team battle royal. Throughout the remainder of 2021, Gunn primarily teamed with his father in tag team bouts on AEW Dark and AEW Dark: Elevation. Gunn wrestled his first match on AEW Dynamite on August 25, 2021, teaming with his father and brother to defeat The Factory in a six-man tag team match. On the September 1, 2021 episode of AEW Dynamite, the Gunn Club turned heel by attacking Paul Wight. In November 2021, the Gunn Club began a short feud with Darby Allin and Sting that saw Colten sustain his first defeat on the December 1, 2021 episode of Dynamite when he was pinned by Sting; this loss also marked the end of the Gunn Club's undefeated streak in AEW. On February 9, 2022, in a match which would air two days later on AEW Rampage, Colten and Austin Gunn wrestled for the AEW World Tag Team Championship, losing to reigning champions Jurassic Express. In May 2022, the Gunn Club formed an alliance with the Acclaimed which lasted until July 2022 when the Gunn Club turned on the Acclaimed; on the August 3, 2022 episode of Dynamite, the Acclaimed defeated the Gunn Club in a dumpster match. 

On the August 17 episode of Dynamite, Colten and Austin turned on their father, aligning themselves with Stokely Hathaway; the following week, Colten defeated his father in a singles match following a low blow. In September 2022, the Gunn Club formed a new stable, "the Firm", with MJF,  Stokely Hathaway, Ethan Page, Lee Moriarty, and W. Morrissey. The following month, the Firm attacked MJF after he fired Hathaway. 

On the February 8, 2023 episode of Dynamite, the Gunn Club defeated the Acclaimed to win their first AEW World Tag Team Championship.

Independent circuit (2021–present) 

Gunn made his independent circuit debut in September 2021, appearing with Battleground Championship Wrestling in Philadelphia, Pennsylvania. In October 2021, the Gunn Club participated in "Chris Jericho's Rock 'N' Wrestling Rager at Sea Triple Whammy", a professional wrestling event held aboard the Norwegian Jewel. In March 2022 on New South Wrestling's "Resurrection" pay-per-view, Gunn won his first title, teaming with Austin Gunn to defeat TME for the NSW Tag Team Championship. The Gunn Club lost the titles to the Bad News Boyz later that month.

Professional wrestling style and persona 
Gunn's finishing move is the Colt 45, a butterfly neckbreaker. He previously used a leg drop bulldog, also called the Colt 45; adopted from his father Billy Gunn, who named it the Fame-Ass-Er. Gunn and his brother Austin/his father also use the 3:10 to Yuma as a double-team maneuver: a back body drop by Colton into a neckbreaker by Austin/Billy.

In November 2021, professional wrestler Danhausen began a Twitter "feud" with the Gunn Club, referring to Colten and Austin as "Ass Boys", in reference to Billy Gunn's "Mr. Ass" gimmick during the Attitude Era. While Billy Gunn himself initially had no comment, the rest of the Gunn Club despised the nickname after fans began chanting "Ass Boys" during their matches. Billy Gunn finally commented when he surprised his sons by wearing an "Ass Boys" shirt, encouraging them to "embrace the assness" and teasing mooning the crowd as he did during his days as Mr. Ass.

Personal life 
Sopp is the son of professional wrestler Monty "Billy Gunn" Sopp. His brother, Austin "Austin Gunn" Sopp, is also a professional wrestler.

Championships and accomplishments 
All Elite Wrestling
AEW World Tag Team Championship (1 time, current) - with Austin Gunn

New South Wrestling
New South Tag Team Championship (1 time) – with Austin Gunn

References

External links 
  
 
 
 

1991 births
21st-century professional wrestlers
AEW World Tag Team Champions
All Elite Wrestling personnel
American male professional wrestlers
Florida State University alumni
Living people
People from Orlando, Florida
Professional wrestlers from Florida